The Saratov single-member constituency (No. 163) is a Russian legislative constituency in the Saratov Oblast.

Members elected

Election results

1993

|-
! colspan=2 style="background-color:#E9E9E9;text-align:left;vertical-align:top;" |Candidate
! style="background-color:#E9E9E9;text-align:left;vertical-align:top;" |Party
! style="background-color:#E9E9E9;text-align:right;" |Votes
! style="background-color:#E9E9E9;text-align:right;" |%
|-
|style="background-color: "|
|align=left|Anatoly Gordeev
|align=left|Independent
|47,664
|17.95%
|-
|style="background-color:#0085BE"|
|align=left|Yevgeny Motorny
|align=left|Choice of Russia
| -
|12.30%
|-
| colspan="5" style="background-color:#E9E9E9;"|
|- style="font-weight:bold"
| colspan="3" style="text-align:left;" | Total
| 265,487
| 100%
|-
| colspan="5" style="background-color:#E9E9E9;"|
|- style="font-weight:bold"
| colspan="4" |Source:
|
|}

1995

|-
! colspan=2 style="background-color:#E9E9E9;text-align:left;vertical-align:top;" |Candidate
! style="background-color:#E9E9E9;text-align:left;vertical-align:top;" |Party
! style="background-color:#E9E9E9;text-align:right;" |Votes
! style="background-color:#E9E9E9;text-align:right;" |%
|-
|style="background-color:blue" |
|align=left|Boris Gromov
|align=left|My Fatherland
|94,860
|29.09%
|-
|style="background-color: "|
|align=left|Anatoly Gordeev (incumbent)
|align=left|Communist Party
|86,524
|26.54%
|-
|style="background-color: " |
|align=left|Mikhail Chugunov
|align=left|Liberal Democratic Party
|26,070
|8.00%
|-
|style="background-color:"|
|align=left|Andrey Rossoshansky
|align=left|Our Home – Russia
|24,487
|7.51%
|-
|style="background-color:#1C1A0D"|
|align=left|Yevgeny Motorny
|align=left|Forward, Russia!
|24,075
|7.38%
|-
|style="background-color: " |
|align=left|Aleksandr Miroshin
|align=left|Independent
|10,533
|3.23%
|-
|style="background-color:#959698"|
|align=left|Vladimir Vlaskin
|align=left|Derzhava
|10,128
|3.11%
|-
|style="background-color:#265BAB"|
|align=left|Valentina Fomina
|align=left|Russian Lawyers' Association
|7,945
|2.44%
|-
|style="background-color:#2C299A"|
|align=left|Dmitry Oleynik
|align=left|Congress of Russian Communities
|4,510
|1.38%
|-
|style="background-color: " |
|align=left|Yuri Usynin
|align=left|Independent
|2,417
|0.74%
|-
|style="background-color:#DD137B"|
|align=left|Lev Ilyukhin
|align=left|Social Democrats
|1,902
|0.58%
|-
|style="background-color: " |
|align=left|Valery Sturov
|align=left|Independent
|1,514
|0.46%
|-
|style="background-color: " |
|align=left|Dmitry Sorokin
|align=left|Independent
|1,171
|0.36%
|-
|style="background-color:#000000"|
|colspan=2 |against all
|22,818
|7.00%
|-
| colspan="5" style="background-color:#E9E9E9;"|
|- style="font-weight:bold"
| colspan="3" style="text-align:left;" | Total
| 326,049
| 100%
|-
| colspan="5" style="background-color:#E9E9E9;"|
|- style="font-weight:bold"
| colspan="4" |Source:
|
|}

1999

|-
! colspan=2 style="background-color:#E9E9E9;text-align:left;vertical-align:top;" |Candidate
! style="background-color:#E9E9E9;text-align:left;vertical-align:top;" |Party
! style="background-color:#E9E9E9;text-align:right;" |Votes
! style="background-color:#E9E9E9;text-align:right;" |%
|-
|style="background-color: "|
|align=left|Valery Rashkin
|align=left|Communist Party
|102,061
|31.66%
|-
|style="background-color:#3B9EDF"|
|align=left|Vyacheslav Maltsev
|align=left|Fatherland – All Russia
|47,652
|14.78%
|-
|style="background-color: " |
|align=left|Arkady Evstafyev
|align=left|Independent
|35,747
|11.09%
|-
|style="background-color:"|
|align=left|Mikhail Yakovlev
|align=left|Unity
|23,965
|7.43%
|-
|style="background-color: " |
|align=left|Vladimir Rodionov
|align=left|Independent
|21,829
|6.77%
|-
|style="background-color:"|
|align=left|Yuri Usynin
|align=left|Our Home – Russia
|17,786
|5.52%
|-
|style="background-color: " |
|align=left|Nikolay Razin
|align=left|Independent
|6,497
|2.02%
|-
|style="background-color:#FF4400"|
|align=left|Valentin Lubnin
|align=left|Andrei Nikolayev and Svyatoslav Fyodorov Bloc
|5,645
|1.75%
|-
|style="background-color: " |
|align=left|Oleg Proskurin
|align=left|Independent
|2,664
|0.83%
|-
|style="background-color:#C62B55"|
|align=left|Roman Torgashin
|align=left|Peace, Labour, May
|2,549
|0.79%
|-
|style="background-color: " |
|align=left|Vyacheslav Mineev
|align=left|Independent
|2,057
|0.64%
|-
|style="background-color: " |
|align=left|Spartak Tonakyan
|align=left|Independent
|2,040
|0.63%
|-
|style="background-color: " |
|align=left|Aleksandr Paradiz
|align=left|Independent
|1,118
|0.35%
|-
|style="background-color:#000000"|
|colspan=2 |against all
|44,323
|13.75%
|-
| colspan="5" style="background-color:#E9E9E9;"|
|- style="font-weight:bold"
| colspan="3" style="text-align:left;" | Total
| 322,332
| 100%
|-
| colspan="5" style="background-color:#E9E9E9;"|
|- style="font-weight:bold"
| colspan="4" |Source:
|
|}

2003

|-
! colspan=2 style="background-color:#E9E9E9;text-align:left;vertical-align:top;" |Candidate
! style="background-color:#E9E9E9;text-align:left;vertical-align:top;" |Party
! style="background-color:#E9E9E9;text-align:right;" |Votes
! style="background-color:#E9E9E9;text-align:right;" |%
|-
|style="background-color: " |
|align=left|Vladislav Tretiak
|align=left|Independent
|68,096
|24.97%
|-
|style="background-color: "|
|align=left|Valery Rashkin (incumbent)
|align=left|Communist Party
|56,601
|20.76%
|-
|style="background-color: " |
|align=left|Aleksey Poleshchikov
|align=left|Independent
|48,465
|17.77%
|-
|style="background-color: " |
|align=left|Vyacheslav Maltsev
|align=left|Independent
|35,828
|13.14%
|-
|style="background-color: " |
|align=left|Dmitry Udalov
|align=left|Independent
|11,482
|4.21%
|-
|style="background-color:#C21022"|
|align=left|Oleg Kuznetsov
|align=left|Russian Pensioners' Party-Party of Social Justice
|5,779
|2.12%
|-
|style="background-color:#1042A5"|
|align=left|Vladimir Yuzhakov
|align=left|Union of Right Forces
|5,111
|1.87%
|-
|style="background-color: " |
|align=left|Aleksey Chernyshov
|align=left|Liberal Democratic Party
|4,188
|1.54%
|-
|style="background-color:#00A1FF"|
|align=left|Aleksandr Timoshok
|align=left|Party of Russia's Rebirth-Russian Party of Life
|1,760
|0.65%
|-
|style="background-color: " |
|align=left|Svetlana Oleynik
|align=left|Independent
|1,501
|0.55%
|-
|style="background-color:#DD137B"|
|align=left|Lev Ilyukhin
|align=left|Social Democratic Party
|1,011
|0.37%
|-
|style="background-color: " |
|align=left|Viktor Oshkin
|align=left|Independent
|830
|0.30%
|-
|style="background-color: " |
|align=left|Anatoly Volkov
|align=left|Independent
|779
|0.29%
|-
|style="background-color: " |
|align=left|Ruslan Miroshnichenko
|align=left|Russian Party of Labor
|620
|0.23%
|-
|style="background-color:#000000"|
|colspan=2 |against all
|26,640
|9.55%
|-
| colspan="5" style="background-color:#E9E9E9;"|
|- style="font-weight:bold"
| colspan="3" style="text-align:left;" | Total
| 272,701
| 100%
|-
| colspan="5" style="background-color:#E9E9E9;"|
|- style="font-weight:bold"
| colspan="4" |Source:
|
|}

2016

|-
! colspan=2 style="background-color:#E9E9E9;text-align:left;vertical-align:top;" |Candidate
! style="background-color:#E9E9E9;text-align:left;vertical-align:top;" |Party
! style="background-color:#E9E9E9;text-align:right;" |Votes
! style="background-color:#E9E9E9;text-align:right;" |%
|-
|style="background-color: " |
|align=left|Oleg Grishchenko
|align=left|United Russia
|171,851
|53.08%
|-
|style="background-color: "|
|align=left|Aleksandr Anidalov
|align=left|Communist Party
|40,390
|12.47%
|-
|style="background-color: " |
|align=left|Anton Ishchenko
|align=left|Liberal Democratic Party
|34,507
|10.66%
|-
|style="background-color: " |
|align=left|Pavel Mironov
|align=left|A Just Russia
|24,328
|7.51%
|-
|style="background-color: " |
|align=left|Viktor Safyanov
|align=left|Communists of Russia
|12,938
|3.99%
|-
|style="background-color: " |
|align=left|Dmitry Khanenko
|align=left|Party of Growth
|12,161
|3.76%
|-
|style="background-color: " |
|align=left|Dmitry Konnychev
|align=left|Yabloko
|11,847
|3.66%
|-
|style="background-color: " |
|align=left|Aleksandr Frolov
|align=left|Greens
|6,346
|1.96%
|-
|style="background-color: " |
|align=left|Aleksandr Ledkov
|align=left|People's Freedom Party
|4,171
|1.29%
|-
| colspan="5" style="background-color:#E9E9E9;"|
|- style="font-weight:bold"
| colspan="4" |Source:
|
|}

2018

|-
! colspan=2 style="background-color:#E9E9E9;text-align:left;vertical-align:top;" |Candidate
! style="background-color:#E9E9E9;text-align:left;vertical-align:top;" |Party
! style="background-color:#E9E9E9;text-align:right;" |Votes
! style="background-color:#E9E9E9;text-align:right;" |%
|-
|style="background-color: " |
|align=left|Olga Alimova
|align=left|Communist Party
|35,400
|45.35%
|-
|style="background-color: " |
|align=left|Dmitry Pyanykh
|align=left|Liberal Democratic Party
|12,499
|16.01%
|-
|style="background-color: " |
|align=left|Svetlana Berezina
|align=left|A Just Russia
|10,101
|12.94%
|-
|style="background: " |
|align=left|Aleksandr Kargopolov
|align=left|Party of Pensioners
|7,934
|10.16%
|-
|style="background: #E62020;"| 
|align=left|Aleksandr Grishantsov
|align=left|Communists of Russia
|5,310
|6.80%
|-
|style="background-color: " |
|align=left|Ksenia Sverdlova
|align=left|Yabloko
|4,110
|5.27%
|-
| colspan="5" style="background-color:#E9E9E9;"|
|- style="font-weight:bold"
| colspan="4" |Source:
|
|}

2021

|-
! colspan=2 style="background-color:#E9E9E9;text-align:left;vertical-align:top;" |Candidate
! style="background-color:#E9E9E9;text-align:left;vertical-align:top;" |Party
! style="background-color:#E9E9E9;text-align:right;" |Votes
! style="background-color:#E9E9E9;text-align:right;" |%
|-
|style="background-color: " |
|align=left|Vyacheslav Volodin
|align=left|United Russia
|173,322
|72.11%
|-
|style="background-color: " |
|align=left|Aleksandr Anidalov
|align=left|Communist Party
|38,534
|16.03%
|-
|style="background-color: " |
|align=left|Dmitry Pyanykh
|align=left|Liberal Democratic Party
|5,987
|2.49%
|-
|style="background-color: " |
|align=left|Aleksey Yemelyanov
|align=left|A Just Russia — For Truth
|5,478
|2.28%
|-
|style="background-color: " |
|align=left|Aleksandr Grishantsov
|align=left|Communists of Russia
|4,260
|1.77%
|-
|style="background-color: "|
|align=left|Yevgeny Savinov
|align=left|New People
|3,498
|1.46%
|-
|style="background-color: " |
|align=left|Aleksey Linev
|align=left|Party of Pensioners
|2,848
|1.18%
|-
|style="background-color: " |
|align=left|Dmitry Konnychev
|align=left|Yabloko
|1,977
|0.82%
|-
|style="background-color: "|
|align=left|Sergey Arzamastsev
|align=left|Rodina
|1,569
|0.65%
|-
| colspan="5" style="background-color:#E9E9E9;"|
|- style="font-weight:bold"
| colspan="3" style="text-align:left;" | Total
| 240,362
| 100%
|-
| colspan="5" style="background-color:#E9E9E9;"|
|- style="font-weight:bold"
| colspan="4" |Source:
|
|}

Notes

Sources
163. Саратовский одномандатный избирательный округ

References

Russian legislative constituencies
Politics of Saratov Oblast